Komsomolsky is a rural locality (a selo) in Karayarsky Selsoviet, Karaidelsky District, Bashkortostan, Russia. The population was 491 as of 2010. There are 16 streets.

Geography 
Komsomolsky is located 33 km southeast of Karaidel (the district's administrative centre) by road. Ust-Sukhoyaz is the nearest rural locality.

References 

Rural localities in Karaidelsky District